Hafid Bouazza (ḥafīẓ būʿazza; 8 March 1970 – 29 April 2021) was a Moroccan-Dutch writer.

Born in Oujda, Morocco, Bouazza came to the Netherlands in October 1977 as a seven-year-old boy. He lived with his parents in the village Arkel, near Gorinchem, until he went to study Arabic language and literature at the University of Amsterdam.

He received the E. du Perron prize for his 1996 debut De voeten van Abdullah (The feet of Abdullah). Later works include Momo and Solomon, in 2001 Een beer in bontjas ("A bear in a fur coat"); the play adaptions Apollien, De slachting in Parijs ("The massacre in Paris") and Othello; and Het monster met de twee ruggen : een kameropera ("The beast with two backs: a libretto"). Bouazza gave the 2002 Mosse Lecture, titled Homoseksualiteit en Islam (Homosexuality and Islam). His 2004 novel Paravion won the 2004 Golden Book-Owl prize. His novel Spotvogel appeared in 2009, after years of silence. Bouazza, an atheist, is known for his criticism of Islam. His sister Hassnae is a noted journalist. In 2014, the Dutch freethinkers association De Vrije Gedachte honoured him with the title of "Freethinker of the Year".

Bouazza died in hospital in Amsterdam on 29 April 2021. He had been struggling with poor health and drug use.

Works
 1996 De voeten van Abdullah (The feet of Abdullah)
 1998 Momo (Momo)
 1998 Apollien (Apollien)
 2000 Schoon in elk oog is wat het bemint (Beauty in each eye is what it loves)
 2001 Een beer in bontjas: autobiografische beschouwingen (A bear in a fur coat: autobiographical considerations)
 2001 De slachting in Parijs (The massacre in Paris)
 2001 Salomon (Salomon)
 2002 Rond voor rond of als een pikhouweel (Round for round or as a pickaxe)
 2003 Othello (Othello)
 2003 Het monster met de twee ruggen : een kameropera (The beast with two backs: a libretto)
 2003 Paravion (Paravion)
 2005 Het temmen van een feeks (The taming of the Shrew)
 2006 De zon kussen op dit nachtuur (Kissing the sun at this hour of the night)
 2006 De vierde gongslag (The fourth beat of the gong)
 2006 Om wat er nog komen moet : pornografica (Because of what's to come: pornographics)
 2009 Spotvogel (Hippolais)
 2014 Meriswin

References

External links

1970 births
2021 deaths
Former Muslim critics of Islam
Dutch atheists
Dutch former Muslims
Dutch male writers
Former Muslims turned agnostics or atheists
Moroccan atheists
Moroccan emigrants to the Netherlands
Moroccan former Muslims
Moroccan writers
Dutch critics of Islam
People from Oujda